A by-election was held for the New South Wales Legislative Assembly electorate of Goulburn on 1 June 1946 because of the resignation of Jack Tully to be appointed Agent-General for New South Wales in London.

Dates

Candidates
 Ray Bladwell, the Country Party candidate, was a local grazier and wool broker. This was his first election campaign and he would unsuccessfully stand for Goulburn in 1947, 1956 and 1959.
 Dick Hollis, the Liberal party candidate, was the Mayor of Goulburn and nephew of the former member Dr Leslie Hollis.
 Laurie Tully, the Labor Party candidate, a son of the former member, was educated at St Patrick's College, Goulburn, former public servant, and barrister.

Results

Jack Tully resigned to be appointed Agent-General for New South Wales in London.

See also
Electoral results for the district of Goulburn
List of New South Wales state by-elections

References

1946 elections in Australia
New South Wales state by-elections
1940s in New South Wales
June 1946 events in Australia